KKTX (1360 kHz) is an AM radio station serving the Corpus Christi, Texas area with a news/talk format. KKTX is under ownership of iHeartMedia, Inc.  The station's studios and offices are located on Old Brownsville Road in Corpus Christi (near the airport), and its transmitter tower is located in the city's west side along Leopard Street.

KKTX began broadcasting as KGFI in 1929, owned by the Caller-Times.  It became KRIS in 1936, and KRYS in 1956.

Blake Farenthold, a Republican who began representing Corpus Christi in the United States House of Representatives for Texas's 27th congressional district in 2011, co-hosted Lago in the Morning on KKTX from 1997 to 2010.

Jim Lago retired from hosting the KKTX morning show in December 2019. The 74 year-old Lago hosted his last show on KKTX on December 6, 2019.

References

External links
NewsRadio 1360 - Official Website

News and talk radio stations in the United States
KTX
Radio stations established in 1929
IHeartMedia radio stations
1929 establishments in Texas